Angraecum birrimense is a species of orchid, found in Ghana, Ivory Coast, Liberia, Nigeria, Sierra Leone, Cameroon and Zimbabwe.

References

birrimense